Doha British School (DBS), established and opened in October 1997, is a co-educational comprehensive International school in the Ain Khaled area of Doha, in the State of Qatar. It offers international education to students from pre-school to Year 13. The students are of over 85 nationalities.

History 
Doha British School was originally known as Doha Montessori and British School (DMBS) before it was re-branded in Spring 2011. The school delivers the National Curriculum for England throughout primary and secondary school, giving students the opportunity to complete International General Certificate of Secondary Education (International GCSE) qualifications during Years 10 and 11.

Doha British School offers both the International Baccalaureate Diploma Programme and national A Level to its sixth form students in Years 12 and 13. The institution became an IB World School in March 2010 and has since been delivering the Diploma Programme with a wide range of subjects from different disciplines for its students as a school-leaving qualification option. In September 2015, the AS Level (first year of the GCE A Level) award was introduced as another option for students to provide students with choice.

The school has been an active member of the Duke of Edinburgh International Award.

The school has also been a driving force in founding the inter-school organization  The British Schools of Qatar, and played an active role in the organization of the first ever BISQ Games, hosted at Aspire Zone in early 2018.

Starting September 2019, DBS will begin offering the final year of the A Level Programme (A2 Level) as well as the BTEC Extended Diploma, alongside the already established IB Diploma Programme and AS Level, becoming the only British School in Qatar to offer such a wide variety of pathways in post-16 education.

Campuses

Ain Khaled Campus
The first and oldest DBS school in Doha is DBS Ain Khaled. Accredited member of BSME and CIS.
The number of university and further education pathways available at DBS Ain Khaled is also unique. The Senior School offers IGCSE, AS Level, A Level, IB, and BTEC qualifications.

The school is justifiably proud of the well-rounded young adults it produces, with character education at the heart of curriculum design and a diverse range of extra-curricular activities.

Al Wakrah Campus
DBS Wakra is an international school that serves its local community of Al-Wakrah, and also welcomes students from other countries. 

DBS Wakra began as a primary school in 2014, but it quickly expanded into a 4-18 all-through provision. 

DBS Wakra received an outstanding rating during its 2021 BSO inspection and was rated 'highly effective' (the highest possible rating) during its 2022 QNSA inspection.

Rawdat Al Hamama Campus
DBS Rawdat is the third and newest campus in the DBS school cluster. The campus is located at the northern end of Doha, in the heart of Rawdat Al Hamama, just a short distance from the iconic Lusail stadium. The campus opened in 2023 and provides a co-educational education to students from EYFS to Yr 13. 

The school has British ethos and offers EYF, KS1, KS2, KS3, and IGCSE programs. The vast majority of staff are either directly recruited from the United Kingdom or from other International schools around the world. If they are from another Native English Speaking country, all of the teaching staff have UK teaching qualifications or a qualification recognized as equivalent. 

The student body is made up of 70% expatriate students and 30% domestic students. Over 30 nationalities are represented among the 70%. This enables students to cultivate tolerance and understanding on a truly global and international scale.

DBS Rawdat was inspected in January 2023 by British Schools Overseas (BSO), a body authorized by the UK Office for Educational Standards to inspect international and independent schools. 

The purpose-built facilities at the school actively support students' personal and academic development while also providing opportunities for further learning.
2 Libraries,
Music Rooms,
Science Laboratories,
Multi-Purpose Hall,
Performance Room,
Indoor Gymnasiums,
Indoor Swimming Pool,
Computer Laboratories,
Design Technology Workshops,
STEM Room,
Sports Pitch,
Outdoor Games Courts,
Cafeterias,
Adventure Playground,
Nurses Clinic,
Auditorium,
Sixth Form Common Area,
The 'DBS Ways' underpin all DBS schools' curriculum, which embodies a whole-school approach to character education, providing a deep and rich experience for all. DBS takes pride in giving its students the opportunity to meet and exceed their academic potential while also instilling in them a growth mindset for learning. The DBS schools ensure that their curriculum remains relevant, rich, and challenging through an annual review.

References 

Schools in Qatar
British international schools in Qatar
1997 establishments in Qatar
Doha British School Organization
International schools in Qatar